Tokyo Xtreme Racer 3 (known in Japan as Shutokou Battle 01) is a racing game for the PlayStation 2 and the follow-up to the 2001 game Tokyo Xtreme Racer: Zero. The game was also released in North America, and unlike the series' previous episodes, was not published in Europe. This is the last game in the series to take place on Tokyo's vast highway system.  The later games for PlayStation 2 were Tokyo Xtreme Racer: Drift (prequel) and Tokyo Xtreme Racer: Drift 2 (sequel). Each of these games took place in the mountains of Japan.

Story
2 years after the events of Shutokou Battle 0 (and sometime after the events of Tokyo Xtreme Racer: Drift 2), the news of the 13 Devils' defeat has been communicated through all of Japan.
Tokyo is plunged into chaos and now two more cities want to compete: Osaka and Nagoya. 
The racers here will have to beat every team in these 3 cities, and maybe, have the opportunity to challenge the best drivers in each: Speed King & Dejected Angel in Tokyo, Seeks, Genesis R & D3 in Nagoya and No Loser & Darts in Osaka.

Final Bosses
Tokyo :
1st level :
- Setsuko Kuroe, aka Dejected Angel : Former member of the 13 Devils, she used to drive a white S14, but was defeated by a wanderer racer 2 years ago. After that, she now drives a Silvia S15 and has returned as an even fiercer opponent.

2nd level
- Motoya Iwasaki, the Speed King/Jintei : Former leader of the 13 Devils (13 Military Ogres in US version), he was the best driver on the highway. But he lost to an unknown driver 2 years ago (see Shutokou Battle 0) and rumor said that he left the highway forever.  Driving his blue Skyline GT-R R34, he returned with increased power and is faster than ever. (Note : If in the game, Iwasaki's car has Ablfug's rear bumper and C-West's front bumper and rear spoiler, the cinematic after beating him shows us a blue MCR Skyline GT-R with Speed King's license plate and vinyls.)

Nagoya :
1st level :
- Nobuhiro Oda, aka Darkness Seven : He has had a long career as a racer, having raced since graduating high school. Driving a black Lexus GS300, he is both a rival and a comrade with Seeks' leader, Yota Takino and they join forces to fight a common enemy.

- Yota Takino, aka Ogre Deity : Seeks' leader with ambition. Therefore, he doesn't hesitate to say rough things to his team members. Driving a brown Toyota Supra, he is a both rival and a comrade with Genesis R's leader, Nobuhiro Oda and will join forces with him if necessary.

2nd level :
- Hiroaki Sakabura, The Rook : One of the members of Nagoya's strongest racing posse D3. There are many true believers of his complete racing method. He has scrutinized parts in his grey Toyota Supra and doesn't allow for any margin of error.

- Shinichiro Kanatani, The Bishop : One of the members of Nagoya's most powerful racing posse D3. His machine, a white Toyota Supra, on whose settings he has labored tirelessly, is sometimes referred to as "a racing work of art".

- Keita Arai, The Knight : One of the members of Nagoya's strongest racing posse D3. A former detective, he now works in private investigation. Even amongst D3, he has an outstanding technique when he drives his black Supra.

Osaka :
1st level :
- Toshifumi Asakawa, aka Naniwa's Warship : Leader of the No Loser, he believes that the mechanism of the vehicle is the most important thing : in other words, if the vehicle is complete, which is the case for his Lancer Evolution V, the driver's skill doesn't matter.

2nd level :
- Noboru Kawajiri, aka God's Estuary : Leader of the Darts in his Ford GT Concept, he was formally provided with the team sticker after systematically battling over 70 members of his team. He only races against opponents who have recognized capabilities.

Bonus : Unknown : Unknown is the final boss of the game and appears only if you have defeated EVERY rivals. He's not ??? for his car isn't the Devil Z, but the player's ghost car, allowing him to not be slow down by the traffic or by the player.

Gameplay
The premise of the game is identical to the previous variants of the Tokyo Xtreme Racer series: the player cruises the highways of Japan at night, while challenging opponents to impromptu battles. When the race begins, each vehicle has a health meter which slowly drains if players' opponent is ahead of them or if they collide with walls, rails, or other vehicles. The race is over when one vehicle's health meter runs out no matter how long (time & distance) the race lasts. The race could also end prematurely if the player and the AI racer(s) drive in separate directions when the highway splits. This results in a draw.

In the beginning of the game, the player will start with a small variety of "slow" cars. As the player races other rivals in the game, they can unlock the type of car being driven at the time to be used in standard cruise modes. There are over 80 cars from 15 different manufacturers, which include Japanese, American, and European cars. It is advisable to start the game with a vehicle that is more powerful; these vehicles have the greatest potential for use in the later, more difficult parts of the game, and it is entirely possible to clear the entire game using only one's starting car. The cars have a wide variety of tuning options, including body kits, engines, drive-train systems, rims, lighting, paint, and even a custom paint shop that can be utilized to create special designs. The player can own up to 5 personalized cars at a given time, which contain components that are all how the user wants them to be.

The player will race against race gangs that have their own attitude and requirements, and compete against wanderers that do not belong to any individual group. These wanderers all have specific requirements to meet before they will race players, such as a certain day of the week. Weather conditions, modifications, and even which car the player is driving are all other examples of requirements. In the end there are a total of 600 rivals within a 2-stage story mode. The cities shown in the game include the capital Tokyo, Nagoya, and Osaka, with the most complex being Tokyo. The capital includes the inner city, the Wangan expressway, and Yokohama.

Reception

The game was met with mixed reception, as GameRankings gave it a score of 64.64%, while Metacritic gave it 63 out of 100.

The North American version drew harsh criticism because of a currency conversion bug that prevented players from completing the game. One of the rivals named "Whirlwind Fanfare", located in Osaka, requires the player to have 100,000,000 CR in order to race her, which is just 10 CR over the maximum amount the player can amass, which is 99,999,990, preventing them from starting a battle with her and thus finishing the game.  The sole cause of this bug was an oversight during localization in which CR values for the North American release were intended to be 10% of their Japanese counterparts to represent US dollars instead of Japanese yen; the developers forgot to update the CR quota for challenging Whirlwind Fanfare.

References

External links

2003 video games
Crave Entertainment games
Genki (company) games
Multiplayer and single-player video games
PlayStation 2 games
PlayStation 2-only games
Tokyo Xtreme Racer
Video game sequels
Video games developed in Japan
Video games set in Nagoya
Video games set in Osaka
Video games set in Tokyo
Video games set in Yokohama